Earl Edwards may refer to:

Earl Edwards (songwriter), American songwriter
Earl Edwards (American football) (born 1946), American football player 
Earl Gene Edwards
Earl Edwards Jr. (born 1992), American soccer player

See also 
Earle Edwards (1908–1997), American football coach